"Wife of God" can refer to:
God's Wife, a term which was often allocated to royal women during the 18th Dynasty of Egypt
Heavenly Mother, the wife and feminine counterpart of God the Father in some religions
Mother goddess, the feminine counterpart of gods in some religions

See also
Mother Nature
Hera, wife of Zeus in ancient Greek religion and Queen of Gods
Asherah, wife of Yahweh (Canaanite deity)
Frigg, wife of Odin and Queen of Asgard
Queen of Heaven, title of Mary, mother of Jesus